Orexo is a pharmaceutical company based in Uppsala, Sweden initially financed with venture capital provided by HealthCap.

The company was founded in 1995 and their first product Diabact UBT, a breath test for diagnosing the causative agent of stomach ulcers (Helicobacter pylori), was introduced in 2000. In 2003, the company adopted the name Orexo and in 2005 the company was listed on the Stockholm Stock Exchange. On March 29, 2019 a U.S. jury rejected a claim by Sweden’s Orexo AB that two generic opioid-addiction treatments created by Teva Pharmaceutical Industries Ltd. infringed a patent for Orexo’s biggest drug, Zubsolv.

Products
  Abstral, for the treatment of breakthrough cancer pain. It was approved in 2008 in Europe and for marketing in United States by the FDA in 2011.
  Edluar, for the treatment of short-term insomnia. FDA approved in 2009.
 Zubsolv  a dissolvable tablet which combines the drugs buprenorphine and naloxone and treats opioid dependency and addiction. FDA approved in July 2013. Launched in the United States in September 2013

References

External links
 

Pharmaceutical companies of Sweden
Companies based in Uppsala County
Companies listed on Nasdaq Stockholm